The following lists events that happened in 2012 in Zimbabwe.

Incumbents 
 President: Robert Mugabe 
 Prime Minister: Morgan Tsvangirai 
 First Vice President: Joice Mujuru
 Second Vice President: John Nkomo

Events

June

 June 29 - The one-hour documentary titled All the President's Elephants, featuring Sharon Pincott's decade of work with the Presidential Elephants of Zimbabwe and the Reaffirmation of the Presidential Decree, premiered at the 2012 Durban International Film Festival, where it was considered among the best on show. It went on to win many international accolades, keeping Zimbabwe's flagship elephant herd in the international spotlight.

References

 
2010s in Zimbabwe
Zimbabwe
Zimbabwe
Years of the 21st century in Zimbabwe